Carlyle August Luer (August 23, 1922 – November 9, 2019) was a botanist specializing in the Orchidaceae. His specialty interest was the Pleurothallidinae (Genus Pleurothallis) and allied species.

Born to Carl & Vera Luer, he was raised in Alton, Illinois and later attended Washington University in St. Louis School of Medicine, graduating in 1946. From there he went on to be a surgeon in Sarasota, Florida and upon retirement in 1975 took up the study and botanical illustration of Orchids.

He aided in the foundation of the Marie Selby Botanical Gardens and was the first editor of their research journal Selbyana. He was a senior curator at the Missouri Botanical Garden and published numerous articles and two books related to orchid taxonomy. Luer died at the age of 97 on November 9, 2019.

References

1922 births
2019 deaths
People from Alton, Illinois
Washington University School of Medicine alumni
Physicians from Illinois
21st-century American botanists
Missouri Botanical Garden people
Washington University in St. Louis alumni